Colin Malcolm Jones (born 30 October 1963) is an English former professional footballer who played in the Football League for Mansfield Town.

References

1963 births
Living people
English footballers
Association football forwards
English Football League players
West Bromwich Albion F.C. players
Mansfield Town F.C. players